Form/Alkaline is the fourth studio album by Scar Tissue, released independently on February 1, 2008. Formerly it had been self-released after 21st Circuitry Records dissolved in 2002 and then re-released as a digital download in 2008.

Track listing

Personnel
Adapted from the Form/Alkaline liner notes.

Scar Tissue
 Philip Caldwell – programming, vocals
 Steve Watkins – programming, vocals

Release history

References

External links 
 Form/Alkaline at Bandcamp
 Form/Alkaline at Discogs (list of releases)

2008 albums
Scar Tissue (band) albums